Ben Hur is the second full-length and final album released by the American post-hardcore band Bitch Magnet. It was recorded after the departure of Bitch Magnet's added guitarist, David Gait, and features an appearance by the band's occasional guitarist, David Grubbs. Ben Hur was recorded by Louisville, Kentucky producer Howie Gano who had engineered albums by Grubbs' previous band, Squirrel Bait.

Release and reception

Ben Hur was first released in 1990 by Glitterhouse Records. First issue of release came with a bonus 7" that contains the songs Sadie and Where Eagles Fly. In 2011, it was remastered by Alan Douches and released in a box-set containing with the rest of the band's catalog.

Track listing
All songs written by Bitch Magnet

Personnel

Bitch Magnet
Orestes Delatorre – drums
Jon Fine – guitar
Sooyoung Park – bass guitar, vocals

Additional musicians and production
David Grubbs – guitar on "Valmead"
Howie Gano – recording
Arden Geist – recording
Mike McMackin – mastering, recording

References

1990 albums
Bitch Magnet albums